Khwee is a village in Central District of Botswana. It is located 60 km south of the mining town Letlhakane, and it has a primary school. The population was 477 in 2001 census.

References

Populated places in Central District (Botswana)
Villages in Botswana